The 2016 World Series of Boxing is the sixth edition of the World Series of Boxing since its establishment in 2010 and runs from January 18 to May 21 of 2016. The event is organised by the International Boxing Association (AIBA). The sixteen teams, divided into four groups of four, contain a majority of boxers from the country in which they are based along with a smaller number of overseas boxers.

Astana Arlans (Kazakhstan) is the defending champion.

Teams

 Argentina Condors
 Astana Arlans
 Baku Fires
 British Lionhearts
 Caciques de Venezuela
 China Dragons
 Cuba Domadores
 Mexico Guerreros
 Morocco Atlas Lions
 Puerto Rico Hurricanes
 Rafako Hussars Poland
 Russian Boxing Team
 Türkiye Conquerors
 Ukraine Otamans
 USA Knockouts
 Uzbek Tigers

Group stage

Group A

Group B

Group C

Group D

Play-offs

References

World Series of Boxing
2016 in boxing